The Bolshaya Tereshka or simply Tereshka is a river in the Ulyanovsk and Saratov oblasts of the Russian Federation, a right tributary of the Volga. It begins in the Privolzhskaya Hills and flows to the Volgograd Reservoir. Ice on the Tereshka forms in November or December and thaws in March or April.

References 

Rivers of Ulyanovsk Oblast
Rivers of Saratov Oblast